St. Michael's Episcopal Cathedral is an Episcopal cathedral in Boise, Idaho, United States. It is the seat of the Diocese of Idaho.

History

The first services of the Episcopal Church were celebrated in Boise in August 1864 and St. Michael's Church was organized that year by the Rev. Saint Michael Fackler. Two years later the first church building was constructed. It was the first Episcopal church in what is now Idaho, Montana and Utah. The building, later renamed Christ Chapel, stands today on the campus of Boise State University. The women's auxiliary staged concerts, dances, and socials and the proceeds went toward the building of the present church building. Construction for the cathedral began on September 7, 1899, and it was completed the following year. The debt was paid off in 1902 and the church was consecrated on May 25 of that year. The Bishop Daniel S. Tuttle House was built in 1907 and it is attached to the church building.

In the past, St. Michael's parishioners supported two other Episcopal institutions in Boise. St. Margaret's Hall, a school for girls, was founded in 1892. Because of the Great Depression, the Rt. Rev. Middleton Barnwell converted the school into Boise Junior College in 1932. The school became independent in 1934 and is now Boise State University. St. Luke's Hospital was founded six months after the cathedral's dedication. It is now run by an independent non-profit board.

The cathedral was included in the Boise Capitol Area District, listed on the National Register of Historic Places in 1976.

Architecture
St. Michael's was designed by prominent New York City church architect Henry Martyn Congdon. Local architect John E. Tourtellotte was the supervising architect. The exterior of the Gothic Revival structure is clad in Boise sandstone, a common building material used on many buildings in the city's early years. The interior features hammerbeam roof trusses. The rose window, known as the Window of the Archangels, was installed in the main facade in 1945. The corner tower, which was part of the original design, was completed in 1949. The transept was added in 1976. The Tiffany window in the east transept was created around 1918. The spire on the tower was added in 1980.

See also
List of the Episcopal cathedrals of the United States
List of cathedrals in the United States
Bishop Funsten House

References

External links

Further reading
Cathedral Cookery: Favorite Recipes of the Women of Saint Michael's and Friends, (Cookbook Publishers, Inc., 1978)

Religious organizations established in 1864
Churches completed in 1900
19th-century Episcopal church buildings
Gothic Revival church buildings in Idaho
Episcopal church buildings in Idaho
Michael, Boise
Cathedrals in Idaho
Historic district contributing properties in Idaho
Churches on the National Register of Historic Places in Idaho
Churches in Boise, Idaho